Alex McManus is a musician from Omaha, Nebraska currently based in Vancouver, BC. He has played with such bands as Acorns, Empire State, Lambchop, Vic Chesnutt, and Bright Eyes. He is also in his own band called The Bruces.

Selected discography

Albums as The Bruces

Singles as The Bruces

Compilation Appearances as The Bruces

With Acorns

With Frontier Trust

With Simon Joyner

With Vic Chesnutt

With Lambchop

With Empire State

With Bright Eyes

Other Appearances

References

External links
The Bruces
Simon Joyner
Lambchop
Unread Records
Saddle Creek Records
Lazy-i Interview: January 2003
   

American indie rock musicians
Living people
Musicians from Omaha, Nebraska
Saddle Creek Records artists
Lambchop (band) members
Year of birth missing (living people)
Misra Records artists